Sebuku (also spelled Seboekoe or Sebeekee) is an island in the Sunda Strait between Java and Sumatra. It is administratively part of South Lampung Regency, Lampung.

History
At the time of the 1883 eruption of Krakatoa, Sebuku was uninhabited, but a village on Sebuku Ketjil, a small island to its east, was completely wiped out. Official records give 150 killed, with 70 being non-residents.

In the 1920s, copra palms were planted on Sebuku to satisfy the growing market. However, due to a lack of maintenance the palms eventually withered and died.

In 1999 a sunken Japanese ship was found near Sebuku by divers preparing for an underwater photography contest. Its age is unknown.

Geography
It is administratively part of South Lampung Regency, Lampung.

Sebuku has a centre composed of andesite, indicating an early volcanic history. This centre has been dated to the Quaternary and has been called an early manifestation of volcanism in the Sunda Strait. The substrate on the northern side of the island consists of fossilised coral, mud and sand, while on the eastern side of the island the substrate consists of mud, sand, gravel, and both live and fossilised coral. The outside is fringed by a reef.

Ecology
Sebuku, along with Sebesi, has been noted as a "stepping stone" for butterfly migration between Sumatra and Krakatoa. There are numerous butterfly species from both Java and Sumatra on Sebuku. Four species of ants have been found on Sebuku, fewer than Sebesi and Krakatoa. These included ants not found on Krakatoa, thought to be descended from fauna that survived the 1883 eruption.

The waters near Sebuku have fewer echinoderms than further into the Lampung Bay. This is thought to be from exploitation and poor resource management.

Due to cultivation, few natural forests remain on Sebuku. However, along the eastern coast of Sebuku there are many mangroves. There are also tropical plants found throughout the island.

Tourism
Sebuku is a popular destination for snorkelling and diving, with tourists generally arriving by boat from Candi village on Sumatra.

References

Bibliography
 
 
 
 
 
 
 
 

Islands of the Sunda Strait
Krakatoa
Lampung
Tourist attractions in Lampung
Quaternary volcanoes of Indonesia
Uninhabited islands of Indonesia